Birthe Kjær (born 1 September 1948) is a Danish singer. She finished second at the Dansk Melodi Grand Prix in 1980, 1986 and 1987, before winning in 1989, and went on to finish third at the 1989 Eurovision Song Contest in Lausanne. She also finished third at the Dansk Melodi Grand Prix in 1991.

Career
Born in Aarhus,) Kjær began her career in the late 1960s. she had made previous bids to represent Denmark in the Eurovision Song Contest, finishing second in 1980, 1986 and 1987, before being chosen in 1989 with the cabaret-style song "Vi maler byen rød" (We paint the town red). Her performance in Lausanne earned the song a third-place finish. She hosted the Danish national contest in 1990, before attempting to represent Denmark again in 1991, finishing third at that years Dansk Melodi Grand Prix with "Din musik, min musik".

In June 2004, her single with Safri Duo "Hvor' vi fra?" (the Denmark national football team's anthem for the 2004 UEFA European Football Championship) achieved a gold record with 4,900 copies sold. In Autumn 2005, she took part in the second season of the Danish Dancing with the Stars ("Vild med dans"), but she withdrew following a heart attack. On 31 January 2009, Kjær hosted the Danish final to pick the 2009 Danish entry for the Eurovision Song Contest.

Discography

Albums

Filmography
1973: Revykøbing kalder
1988: Jydekompagniet
2000: Max

References

External links

1948 births
Living people
Eurovision Song Contest entrants for Denmark
20th-century Danish women singers
Eurovision Song Contest entrants of 1989
Singers from Aarhus
21st-century Danish women singers